Berg is a locality situated in Gävle Municipality, Gävleborg County, Sweden with 213 inhabitants in 2010.

References 

Gävle
Populated places in Gävle Municipality
Gästrikland